"Slapper (Ayye)" is the seventh single by British recording artist Nadia Oh. The song was written by Space Cowboy and 'Oh and produced by the former. Released on 12 March 2012 via iTunes in the United Kingdom and United States it has since gone on to top the radio chart, SparaTop40.

Its video, premiering 22 May 2012 focuses on 'Oh herself and is her first not to focus or heavily use green screen. The song has been well received by fans and by fellow artists, where DJ Diplo added the track to his radio playlist.

Composition
Written and produced by Space Cowboy it contains elements of SL2's "On a Ragga Trip". It also contains references to Kim Kardashian, Rick Ross and the song's producer. It uses the reference towards the producer, "Space Cowboy Just Play That Track" for the single version, however the video version stops at "Cowboy". Another difference in the video edit is the reference towards Kardashian.

Release

Release date
The song was released online on 7 March 2012, collecting a warm response it was released digitally on 15 March. It also received its first play on BBC Radio One by Diplo.

Music video
The music video was released online at YouTube. It sees 'Oh in front of fluorescent coloured walls and white backgrounds in numerous outfits, most notably as a mermaid and a French maid. The video begins with 'Oh in front of a white background placing her hands around her hips before an assortment of further scenes are quickly previewed such as The Mermaid, The Black Outfit and The Green Head Wear. Before 'Oh starts to sing. From then no more new clips are shown before concluding on the white background.

The video has received a positive response from Netizens with one calling it "Her best video" and others hailing it "my summer anthem", However the criticism came from the feel for a dance sequence. It currently has 100,000 hits; her highest viewed video yet and an estimated 90% approval from fans.

Track list and formats
Download
 Slapper (Ayye) - Explicit
 Slapper (Ayye) - Censored

Chart performance
Although it did not achieve commercial success, on 12 June 2012 'Oh announced along with StaraRadio that the song had topped the radio chart show. As of 26 June, it has spent a total of 10 weeks in the chart.

References

2012 singles
2012 songs